The women's competition in the featherweight (– 53 kg) division was staged on November 22, 2009.

Schedule

Medalists

Records

Results

References
Results

- Women's 53 kg, 2009 World Weightlifting Championships
World